Corbeni is a commune in Argeș County, Muntenia, Romania. It is composed of eight villages: Berindești, Bucșenești, Corbeni, Oeștii Pământeni, Oeștii Ungureni, Poienari, Rotunda and Tulburea.

References

Communes in Argeș County
Localities in Muntenia